The 1927 Kirkham-Williams X or Kirkham-Williams Racer was designed as a private US contender for the 1927 Schneider Trophy. Though it flew just before the contest, it was still under development and was withdrawn. Soon after it was modified into a landplane, seeking to set a new speed record. Some high speed flights were made but no official record was set.

Design and development

The Kirkham-Williams Racer was a single bay sesquiplane. It used a thin airfoil section and had constant chord wings with elliptical tips. Single outward-leaning interplane struts were constructed around dural and spruce frames, with a plywood covering. There were ailerons on both upper and lower wings.

The Racer was powered by a  water-cooled, X-24 cylinder Packard X-2775 loaned by the US Navy, a new design based on pair of V-12s with a common crankshaft. Together with similar oil cooling radiators, they covered almost the entire wing surface. Behind the engine the fuselage was a laminated spruce monocoque with an open cockpit aft of the wings faired rearwards into an integral fin with a rectangular rudder. A mid-fuselage mounted, wire-braced tailplane carried divided elevators.

Each float was mounted on two steel struts, enclosed in dural sheet fairings. The forward strut was joined at the side of the engine mounting and the rear one met its opposite partner on the fuselage underside centre-line. Diagonal struts from the feet of the forward struts on the float joined the top of the rear struts to provide cross-bracing and two horizontal struts connected the floats together.

Operational history

The first trials on water, in Manhasset Bay, did not start until 31 July 1927. Spray problems required float modifications and the Racer was not back on the water  until 17 August. With the Schneider Cup scheduled for Venice on the 23 September, Williams requested a delay but this was rejected by the UK, so he withdrew from the contest on 9 September. 

The Racer's first flight, delayed by bad weather, was on 31 August. It was  overweight and had engine cooling problems. As speeds increased, Williams reported instabilities above  associated with the floats.
 
Afterwards the Racer swapped floats for conventional, fixed, wheeled landing gear with faired legs.

These disappointing speeds led to the wind-tunnel tests that revealed the drag of the wing radiators. The lessons of the 1927 biplane with its Packard engine and mount went into the monoplane 1929 Williams Mercury Racer  which Williams originally designed to gain the  speed record. He was pressured into offering it, on floats, for the 1929 Schneider contest but in the end it was not taken to Calshot for the contest and was abandoned.

Specifications (floatplane)

References

Sesquiplanes
Single-engined tractor aircraft
Floatplanes
Racing aircraft
Schneider Trophy
1920s United States aircraft
Aircraft first flown in 1927